George R. Krebs (March 5, 1872 – May 8, 1939) was an American football player and coach. He served as the fifth head football coach
at West Virginia University in Morgantown, West Virginia and he held that position for the 1897 season, in which he also captained the team.
His coaching record at West Virginia was 5–4–1. A native of New Martinsville, Krebs graduated from West Virginia University in 1899 in with a degree in engineering.

Krebs also played professional football during this period for the Latrobe Athletic Association and was even a member of the 1898 Western Pennsylvania All-Star football team. He died in 1939 of heart problems.

Head coaching record

References

External links
 

1872 births
1939 deaths
19th-century players of American football
American football guards
1898 Western Pennsylvania All-Star football players
Latrobe Athletic Association players
West Virginia Mountaineers football coaches
West Virginia Mountaineers football players
People from New Martinsville, West Virginia
Coaches of American football from West Virginia
Players of American football from West Virginia